Mission San Pedro Mártir de Verona was established by the Dominican missionary José Loriente on 27 April 1794, in the Sierra San Pedro mountain range in northern Baja California, Mexico.

Located at an elevation above 1,500 meters above sea level and far inland, Mission San Pedro Mártir appears to represent an initiative by the Dominicans to extend control over the Kiliwa people who had lived outside the scope of the earlier coastal missions.

The first site of the mission was Casilepe; later in the same year it was relocated to Ajantequedo, about 13 kilometers to the northeast. The date for the closing of the mission is somewhat uncertain, being reported as both 1806 and 1824. The mission's neophytes were relocated to Mission Santo Domingo.

Conservation
Archaeological explorations have located possible traces of the first mission site. Foundations and walls survive at the second mission site.

See also
Spanish missions in Baja California

References

 Foster, John W., and Julia Bendímez Patterson. 1997. "A Note on the Ruins of Casilepe in the Sierra San Pedro Mártir, Baja California". Pacific Coast Archaeological Society Quarterly 33(3):29-36.
 Meigs, Peveril, III. 1935. The Dominican Mission Frontier of Lower California. University of California Publications in Geography No. 7. Berkeley.
 Vernon, Edward W. 2002. Las Misiones Antiguas: The Spanish Missions of Baja California, 1683-1855. Viejo Press, Santa Barbara, California.

External links
Ruins of Misión San Pedro Mártir de Verona in 2012, WildBaja

Pedro Martir de Verona
Landmarks in Ensenada
1794 establishments in New Spain